Route choice may refer to:
Path selection in Network routing
Route choice (orienteering)
Route assignment